Gaetbulibacter aquiaggeris is a Gram-negative and rod-shaped bacterium from the genus of Gaetbulibacter which has been isolated from seawater from Korea.

References

Flavobacteria
Bacteria described in 2016